Pictured Within was the first studio album from Deep Purple's Jon Lord in sixteen years. It features performances from Sam Brown, Miller Anderson, Pete York and Thijs van Leer among others. Pictured Within was released in October 1998 by Virgin Classics. "Wait a While", one of the few non-instrumental tracks off the album, performed by Sam Brown, was issued as a single in 1999. In addition, Jon Lord played a short tour of Germany in May 1999 to promote the album.

Track listing
 Part 1 - The Valley
 "Sunrise" (5:47)
 "Pictured Within" (5:22) - Singer: Miller Anderson
 "From the Windmill" (6:55)
 Part 2 - Blue Sky Dreams
 "Circles Of Stone" (2:24)
 "Menorca Blue" (4:10)
 "Evening Song" (8:00) - Singer: Sam Brown
 Part 3 - Of Heroes and Heroines
 "Music for Miriam" (4:48)
 "Arc-En-Ciel" (4:29)
 "Wait a While" (5:57) - Singer: Sam Brown
 Part 4 - Beneath A Higher Heaven
 "Crystal Spa (Kyrie Eleison)" (14:40)
 "The Mountain-Sunset" (5:24)
 "A Different Sky" (6:49)

Production notes
 All music composed by Jon Lord. Lyrics by Jon Lord ("Pictured Within") and Sam Brown ("Evening Song", "Wait a While")
 Mixed at the Everest Studios, Köln
 Recorded at Maarweg Studios, Köln, 1997
 Produced by Jon Lord
 Engineered by Frank Meyer
 Mixed by Frank Meyer and Jon Lord (assisted by Chris Heinemann)

Personnel
 Jon Lord - piano
 Hagen Kuhr - cello
 Ina Stock - oboe, cor Anglais
 Frank Struck - French horn
 Rodrigo Reichel - violin
 Stefan Pintev - violin
 Vytas Sondeckis - cello
 Mike Routledge - viola
 Miller Anderson - vocal
 Sam Brown - vocal
  - percussion, voices
 Pete York - orchestral percussion
 Colin Hodgkinson - fretless bass
 Ravi - kora
 Thijs Van Leer - flute
 Rick Keller - soprano saxophone
Sabine Van Baaren - voices
 Christina Lux-York - voices
 Serge Mailiard - voices
 Stefan Scheuss - voices

1998 albums
Jon Lord albums